Vasyl Mikhailovych Sharovsky (24 December 1891 – 25 April 1938) was a member of the Central Council of Ukraine, an anarcho-communist and an artillery commander of the Revolutionary Insurgent Army of Ukraine.

Biography
Vasyl Mikhailovych Sharovsky was born on 24 December 1891, in Huliaipole.

With the outbreak of World War I, he was called to the front. During his service, he received the title of senior fireworker. While serving in the army, he joined the Ukrainian Socialist-Revolutionary Party, then joined the Borotbists, before finally becoming an anarchist communist. In 1917, he was the head of the battery of the "Black Guards" organized in Huliaipole. In April 1918, Sharovsky, together with a group of former officers of the Imperial Russian Army, organized and led a coup in Huliaipole against the authority of the council and were preparing to meet units of the Austro-Hungarian Army, Imperial German Army and the Ukrainian People's Army.

From January to June 1919, he was the head of artillery of the 3rd Zadneprovskaya brigade, under the command of Nestor Makhno. From September to December 1919, he was Assistant Chief of Artillery of the Revolutionary Insurgent Army of Ukraine (RIAU). From July 1920 to January 1921, he was the Chief of Artillery of the RIAU. In January 1921, in the Korsun region, Vasyl deserted from the RIAU units.

In 1930 he taught in Huliaipole. On 16 February 1938, he was arrested by a troika of the NKVD in the Dnipropetrovsk Oblast, accused of leading a "counter-revolutionary Anarcho-Makhnovist organization" and preparing an armed uprising. He was shot on 25 April 1938.

Recognition
Sharovsky was mentioned in the Bolshevik newspaper Izvestia, on 6 April 1919:

References

Bibliography

 
 

1891 births
1938 deaths
Anarcho-communists
Borotbists
Great Purge victims from Ukraine
Makhnovshchina
Members of the Central Council of Ukraine
Ukrainian anarchists
Ukrainian people of the Ukrainian–Soviet War
Ukrainian people of World War I
Executed anarchists